Zoungrana is a surname. Notable people with the name include:

Chantal Kaboré-Zoungrana, Burkinese animal nutritionist and biosecurity expert
Paul Zoungrana (1917–2000), Roman Catholic Cardinal from Burkina Faso 
Valentin Zoungrana (born 1992), Burkinabe footballer

Surnames of African origin